Osredek is a settlement in the Municipality of Zagorje ob Savi in central Slovenia. It is divided into three hamlets: Zgornji Osredek, Srednji Osredek, and Spodnji Osredek (literally, upper, middle, and lower Osredek).  The area is part of the traditional region of Lower Carniola. It is now included with the rest of the municipality in the Central Sava Statistical Region.

References

External links
Osredek on Geopedia

Populated places in the Municipality of Zagorje ob Savi